The Babes in the Secret Service (French: Les pépées au service secret) is a 1956 French comedy thriller film directed by Raoul André and starring Claudine Dupuis, Louise Carletti and Tilda Thamar.  The film's sets were designed by the art director Louis Le Barbenchon. It is a sequel to the 1955 film The Babes Make the Law.

Synopsis
Having already proven their capabilities in their previous adventures, three sisters are recruited by the French secret service to track down some wanted information on a new explosive device.

Cast
 Claudine Dupuis as Elvire
 Louise Carletti as 	Christine
 Tilda Thamar as 	Olga
 Raymond Souplex as 	Bonneval
 Robert Berri as Carboni 
 Simone Berthier as Hortense
 Alain Bouvette as 	La Quille
 Paul Demange as 	Le chef d'orchestre
 Fabienne as Antigone
 Harry-Max as 	Le médecin de la prison
 René Havard as 	Calamar / Sébastien / Le clochard
 Abel Jacquin as 	Le directeur de la prison
 Robert Le Béal as 	Gauthier
 Roger Legris as 	Le blanchisseur de la prison
 Michèle Philippe as 	Nathalie		
 André Versini as 	Martin

References

Bibliography
 Pallister, Janet L. French-speaking Women Film Directors: A Guide. Fairleigh Dickinson Univ Press, 1997.
 Rège, Philippe. Encyclopedia of French Film Directors, Volume 1. Scarecrow Press, 2009.

External links 
 

1956 films
French comedy thriller films
1950s French-language films
1956 comedy films
Films directed by Raoul André
French sequel films
1950s French films
1950s comedy thriller films
French black-and-white films